Ustad Awalmir (May 8, 1931 – April 24, 1982) was an Afghan composer, musician, singer, and poet who wrote and sang in the Pashto language.

He began learning music as a teen from various music teachers and began to perform for radio broadcasts. His first song was My Heart Has Broken To Pieces. At the age of 18, he performed at the Afghan Independence Day in Kabul.

He made a breakthrough into performing on the Afghan radio station with help from Malang Jan, a local poet. Awalmir's output consists of over 250 songs as well as a collection of self-composed songs. His contribution to Afghan music led him the honor of the title Ustad from the Ministry of Culture and Information.

His love and patriotism for Afghanistan is demonstrated in songs such as the famous "Da Zamong Zeba Watan", meaning "this is our beautiful homeland", referring to Afghanistan.

References

20th-century Afghan male singers
Afghan composers
Pashtun people
Pashto-language singers
1931 births
1982 deaths
20th-century composers